Illusions Received by the Earth (Les Illusions reçues par la Terre) or The Fallen Angel (La Chute d'un ange) is a sculpture by Auguste Rodin, conceived before 1900 and cast before 1952 by the Rudier Foundry.

Casts
One bronze cast of the work is now in Brooklyn Museum. It shows two female figures, using the Torso of Adele as the basis for one of them.

See also
List of sculptures by Auguste Rodin

References

External links

Sculptures by Auguste Rodin